The U-League, officially KUSF College Sports U-League (Korean: KUSF 대학스포츠 U-리그), is operated by the Korea University Sports Federation (KUSF), the organization which oversees college sports in South Korea. The KUSF U-League operates in six different sports which students from member institutions participate in.

The U-League's intended purpose is:
Guarantee the right to learn and improve performance through the operation of the university sports league
Creating a culture of participation by university members and raising awareness of university sports by hosting home and away games on university campuses in a league system

Sports
Baseball — men
Basketball — men & women
Football (soccer) — men
Ice hockey — men
Soft tennis
Volleyball — men & women

Competition format
The U-League operates in a league format which mirrors the leagues in domestic professional sport. The season follows the academic calendar, starting around February or March and ending in November.

Member institutions
The following member institutions participate in the U-League. Some institutions may also sponsor other sports which compete in KUSF-sanctioned competitions outside the U-League system, or sponsor a below-mentioned sport but only as an extracurricular club.

KUSF Club Championship
The U-League is considered to be the "elite" competition, with the majority of participating student-athletes turning professional and often appearing for the South Korea national team at international competitions. The KUSF runs a separate tournament for college sports club teams composed of students who wish to play sports but not at the elite level. The KUSF Club Championship is contested in four team sports: baseball, basketball, volleyball and football (soccer).

History
The KUSF U-League was first established for football in 2008 before being expanded to other sports and becoming the present-day U-League system. It streamlined college competitions into a league/play-off format mirroring professional leagues. The U-League's establishment also meant that member institutions were required to provide academic support for their enrolled student-athletes and shifting admissions policies to include academics, instead of admitting a student based solely on athletic performance while ignoring academic results.

The KUSF U-League system was established during a period of time when there was much criticism over enrolled students (especially middle and high school students) being forced to choose between their studies and athletic pursuits, with students either graduating with bare minimum grades or dropping out altogether. The criticism was particularly directed towards the lack of coordination between their educational institutions and sports administrators, the lack of academic support for student-athletes and the fact that the existing system in place failed to uphold students' "right to learn" or practically prepare student-athletes for life outside of sports. 

The abuse of the "student-athlete" status by Choi Soon-sil to benefit her daughter Chung Yoo-ra and Ewha Womans University's involvement shed light on the KUSF. At that time, it became known that the KUSF issued a new rule for its member institutions regarding academic performance, known as the "C⁰ rule" (under Article 25 of the University Sports Regulations). It refers to the rule that athletes cannot participate in the upcoming semester if their GPA for the previous two semesters was below C⁰, which is a 2.0 GPA on a 4.3 or 4.5 scale depending on institution. The KUSF came under criticism for allegedly enacting the rule as a knee-jerk response to the Choi Soon-sil/Chung Yoo-ra controversy, to which the KUSF countered with a statement that the rule had actually been discussed and announced to member institutions from 2012 to 2015 and C⁰ was the agreed minimum grade.

References

External Links
Korea University Sports Federation Official Website 

 
Student sport in South Korea